Saginomiya Station is the name of two train stations in Japan:

Saginomiya Station (Shizuoka) (さぎの宮駅)
 Saginomiya Station (Tokyo) (鷺ノ宮駅)